Ilithya Manzanilla (born February 15, 1985, Mérida, Yucatan, Mexico), is a Mexican actress.

Filmography

Film

Television

References

External links 

1985 births
Living people
Mexican child actresses
Mexican telenovela actresses
Mexican television actresses
Actresses from Yucatán (state)
People from Mérida, Yucatán
21st-century Mexican actresses